Lacey Schwartz Delgado (born January 9, 1977) is an American filmmaker who is the second lady of New York. She is married to the Lieutenant Governor of New York, Antonio Delgado. As a filmmaker, she is most notable for her 2015 PBS documentary Little White Lie.

Early life
Schwartz, the daughter of Robert and Peggy Schwartz, was  white and raised Jewish in the community of Woodstock, New York. She did not check the racial identity box on her college admission form, but was admitted as a black student based on her photograph. She was not aware that she was a biracial American and that Rodney Parker, an African American man, was her biological father until she confronted her mother in college.

Career
In the PBS documentary, Little White Lie, she tells the story about her unusual upbringing and how finally embracing her racial identity has brought her a modicum of peace. Lacey was raised to believe she was white and Jewish only to begin to question her lineage while in high school and college. This film tracks Lacey’s investigative journey into discovering the lies her family told her from a young age about who her biological father is. She had never considered her life to be "passing" but found a commonality with the people she met in the Black Student Alliance at Georgetown University. She went on to graduate from Harvard Law School, where she met her future husband Antonio Delgado.

Her parents, whenever she questioned her identity growing up, had an answer that sufficed when she was still a child. The family album had pictures of her paternal ancestor, a Sicilian Jew who was of a very dark complexion.  When she entered college life, the looks she got from African-American friends led her to rethink how she had viewed herself and by the time she entered her thirties and began making the film, the truth had already come out.  The family secret, an affair that her mother had with an African-American man, also led to the breakup of her parents' marriage when her father found out about the affair and affirmed what everyone else already knew, that she was the product of multi-racial heritage.

She was born 10 years after the Supreme Court had made its ruling in the case of Loving v. Virginia, which held interracial marriage was legal and there was a spike in births of children born to parents who were black and white, the author Anna Holmes calling that cohort the "Loving Generation".

Personal life
In 2011, Lacey married Antonio Delgado.  In November 2018, her husband was elected to represent New York's 19th congressional district in the U.S. House of Representatives and in 2022 has been serving as the Lieutenant Governor of New York appointed by governor Kathy Hochul. She is the mother of identical twin boys and lives in Dutchess County, New York.

See also
 Anatole Broyard
 Anita Florence Hemmings
 Loving (2016 film)

References

External links
 Lacey Schwartz Delgado personal website
 

African-American Jews
Georgetown University alumni
1977 births
Living people
American documentary filmmakers
African-American film directors
Harvard Law School alumni
American women documentary filmmakers
21st-century African-American people
21st-century African-American women
20th-century African-American people
20th-century African-American women
Second ladies and gentlemen of New York (state)
21st-century American Jews